Kamarlu is a village in Iran.

Kamarlu or Ghamarlu may also refer to:
 Artashat, Armenia
 Metsamor, Echmiadzin, Armenia